Edis Smajić (born 10 September 1999) is a Bosnian professional footballer who plays as an attacking midfielder for Croatian second tier-club Cibalia.

Club career

Sloboda Tuzla
Smajić made his league debut for hometown club Sloboda Tuzla on 18 September 2016, coming on as a 90th-minute substitute in a 0–0 draw with Metalleghe-BSI. Nearly four years after his debut, on 27 June 2020, Smajić left Sloboda after his contract with the club  expired.

VIS Simm-Bau
On 21 August 2020, Smajić signed a contract with First League of FBiH club Vis Simm-Bau. He made his official debut for Vis Simm-Bau on 5 September 2020 in a league match against Rudar Kakanj. Smajić scored his first goal for the club in a league game against Jedinstvo Bihać on 31 October 2020.

International career
Smajić has played for Bosnia and Herzegovina at under-17 and under-19 level. On 28 May 2018, he made his debut for the under-21 side, coming on as an 81st-minute substitute in a 2-0 win over Albania.

References

External links

1999 births
Living people
Sportspeople from Tuzla
Bosnia and Herzegovina footballers
Premier League of Bosnia and Herzegovina players
First League of the Federation of Bosnia and Herzegovina players
FK Sloboda Tuzla players
NK Vis Simm-Bau players
Bosnia and Herzegovina youth international footballers
Bosnia and Herzegovina under-21 international footballers
Association football midfielders